Nataša Bokal (born 9 May 1967) is a retired Slovenian alpine skier. She was the first woman to represent Slovenia at the Olympics.

World Cup results

Season standings

Race podiums

Olympic Games results

World Championships results

References 

1967 births
Living people
Slovenian female alpine skiers
Olympic alpine skiers of Slovenia
Alpine skiers at the 1992 Winter Olympics
Alpine skiers at the 1998 Winter Olympics
Alpine skiers at the 2002 Winter Olympics
Universiade medalists in alpine skiing
People from Škofja Loka
Universiade silver medalists for Yugoslavia
Competitors at the 1987 Winter Universiade
Competitors at the 1989 Winter Universiade